Iqbal Mahmoud Al Assad (Arabic: إقبال محمود الأسعد) is a physician pursuing a pediatric cardiology fellowship at Boston Children's Hospital (graduating in June 2020). She was recognized as one of the youngest doctors in the world when she completed her medical training at age 20. Her name is also seen as Iqbal El-Assaad in some sources.

Biography 
Iqbal Mahmoud Al Assad was born February 2, 1993, in Palestine, but became a refugee in Lebanon. She graduated from high school at age 12 and at age 20 had graduated from the Weill Cornell Medical College in Qatar with a degree in general medicine. She was honored as the youngest Arab doctor after completing her medical accreditation at the age of 20. She has also been rated as one of the most influential women in the Arab world.

She pursued a residency in pediatrics at Cleveland Clinic Children's Hospital after witnessing the disparities in healthcare among the Palestinian refugees in Lebanon. She held the Pediatric Cardiology Fellowship at Boston Children's Hospital and is scheduled to graduate in June 2020. She plans to pursue a subspecialty fellowship in pediatric electrophysiology afterwards.

Awards 
 Children's Hospital of Philadelphia Cardiology Outstanding Investigator Award. Project: "Patient and Neighborhood Level Characteristics as Predictors of Survival in Pediatric Out-of-Hospital Arrests"
 Qatar foundation scholarship. Facilitated by the Lebanon Ministry of Education.

Indexed publications 

 Trends of Out-of-Hospital Sudden Cardiac Death Among Children and Young Adults.
 Lone Pediatric Atrial Fibrillation in the United States: Analysis of Over 1500 Cases.
 Pacemaker implantation in pediatric heart transplant recipients: Predictors, outcomes, and impact on survival.
 Implantable cardioverter-defibrillator and wait-list outcomes in pediatric patients awaiting heart transplantation.
 Use of dofetilide in adult patients with atrial arrhythmias and congenital heart disease: A PACES collaborative study.
 Automated External Defibrillator Application Before EMS Arrival in Pediatric Cardiac Arrests.

References 

Arab women
American pediatric cardiologists
American women physicians
Weill Cornell Medical College alumni
Palestinian women physicians
1993 births
Living people
Lebanese pediatricians
21st-century American women